Michael Angelou Villafuerte Plania (born 6 February 1997) is a Filipino professional boxer.

Professional boxing career
Plania made his professional debut against Lordly Pateno on 22 August 2014, and won the fight by unanimous decision. He amassed a 15–0 record during the next four years, with seven of those victories coming by way of stoppage.

Plania was scheduled to face Juan Carlos Payano for the vacant WBO Inter-continental bantamweight title on 23 March 2018, at the Seminole Hard Rock Hotel and Casino in Miami, in his United States debut. He suffered his first professional loss, as Payano won the fight by unanimous decision, with scores of 96–93, 97-92 and 97–92. Plania faced the journeyman John Rey Lauza on 19 May 2018. He successfully bounced back from his first professional loss with a first-round knockout victory. Plania fought for a regional belt once again on 9 September 2018, as he was scheduled to face Angelito Merin for the vacant WBC-ABC Silver super bantamweight title. He won the fight by a fourth-round technical knockout. Plania faced 	Renan Portes on 25 November 2018, in his last fight of the year. He won the bout by a first-round knockout.

Plania was booked to face Juan Antonio Lopez on 13 January 2019. He won the fight by unanimous decision, with scores of 79–73, 78-74 and 77–75. Plania was next scheduled to face Nicardo Calamba on 30 April 2019. He won the fight by a second-round knockout. Plania made his third appearance of the year on 26 July 2019, against Matias Agustin Arriagada. He won the fight by unanimous decision, with all three judges awarding him a 60-52 scorecard. Plania was booked to fight Julio Buitrago on 25 October 2019. He won the fight by a fourth-round technical knockout. Plania made his fifth and final appearance of the year against Giovanni Gutierrez for the vacant IBF North American super bantamweight title on 21 December 2019. He won the fight by a dominant unanimous decision, with all three judges scoring the fight 100-89 for him.

Plania faced the #1 ranked WBO bantamweight contender Joshua Greer Jr. on 16 June 2020. Despite coming into the fight as an underdog, Plania won the fight by an upset majority decision, with scores of 96–92, 97-91 and 94-94. He twice knocked Greer down, in the first and sixth rounds.

Plania faced Emmanuel Mogawa on 30 April 2021, in his first fight in Philippines since 30 April 2019. He won the fight by unanimous decision, with all three judges scoring the fight 60-54 for him. Plania next faced Ricardo Nunez on 20 November 2021. He won the fight by a first-round technical knockout.

Plania was expected to face the former WBA interim super bantamweight titleholder Ra'eese Aleem on 18 June 2022. The fight was later postponed for 4 September 2022. Plania lost the fight by unanimous decision, with all three judges scoring the fight 100–89 for Aleem. Plania was given a standing count in the eight round, although replays showed the punch did not land flush on him.

Plania is scheduled to face Jeffrey Francisco on 31 December 2022, in what was his first fight in the Philippines since April 2021.

Professional boxing record

References 

1997 births
Super-bantamweight boxers
Bantamweight boxers
Living people
Filipino male boxers